The 1988 Algerian Cup Final was the 26th final of the Algerian Cup. The final took place on June 23, 1988, at Stade 5 Juillet 1962 in Algiers. USK Alger beat CR Belcourt 5-4 on penalties to win their second Algerian Cup.

Pre-match

Details

References

Cup
Algeria
Algerian Cup Finals
USM Alger matches